Eduardo Barbosa Hatamoto (born 6 August 2003), known as Dudu Hatamoto or just Dudu, is a Brazilian footballer who plays as a forward for Ponte Preta.

Career

Early career
Born in Ribeirão Preto, São Paulo, Dudu began his career at hometown side Olé Brasil at the age of seven. In 2014, aged ten, he was spotted by Palmeiras, but suffered a serious knee injury at the age of 13 which kept him sidelined for nearly a year.

After overcoming his knee injury, Dudu had to undergo surgery two further times, due to a heart condition and later due to an apendicitis. After again recovering, he asked to leave the club in 2017.

Botafogo-SP
Dudu subsequently returned to his hometown, and spent a short period at Comercial-SP before joining Botafogo-SP's under-15 category in July 2018. He made his senior debut on 5 November 2020 at the age of just 17, starting and scoring a brace in a 4–3 away win over Marília, for the year's Copa Paulista. The following day, it was announced that he had renewed his contract with the club until 2023.

Dudu made his professional debut for Bota on 20 November 2020, coming on as a second-half substitute for Rafinha in a 1–2 Série B away loss against Guarani. He scored his first professional goal the following 28 February, netting the opener in a 1–1 draw at São Paulo in the Campeonato Paulista.

In April 2021, Dudu suffered an ankle injury in a match against Ituano, which kept him sidelined for four months. Back to action in September, he was regularly used afterwards.

Ponte Preta
On 11 January 2023, Dudu was registered at Ponte Preta, being announced only three days later.

Personal life
On 26 September 2022, Dudu and Botafogo-SP teammates Lucas Delgado and João Diogo were accused of sexual assault in Rio de Janeiro. Delgado was released by the club two days later, while Dudu and João Diogo were punished by Botafogo.

Career statistics

Notes

References

2003 births
Living people
People from Ribeirão Preto
Footballers from São Paulo (state)
Brazilian footballers
Association football forwards
Campeonato Brasileiro Série B players
Campeonato Brasileiro Série C players
Botafogo Futebol Clube (SP) players
Associação Atlética Ponte Preta players